Syed Makbul Hossain (1946 – 16 March 2022), also known as Lechu Mia, was a Bangladeshi politician and businessman. He was twice a member of parliament (1986 and 2001) and held the Sylhet-6 (Beanibazar-Golapganj) seat.

Birth and early life 
Syed Makbul Hossain was born in 1946 in the village of Sundisail in West Amura Union, Golapganj, Sylhet, British Raj. He obtained both his BA and MA in History from the University of Dhaka. He later obtained his PhD from the University of Calcutta. His wife was Sajeda Parveen. He had one son, Syed Tanvir Hossain, and one daughter, Syeda Adiba Hussain.

Career 
Syed Makbul Hossain actively participated in the war of liberation. He started his career as a government official after the independence of Bangladesh.

He served as the Deputy Commissioner of Tangail District. He resigned from the post of Deputy Secretary in 1975 and started his business. He was the Founder of Syed Makbul Hossain High School and Degree College in his birthplace Sundisail village.  He was also the founder of many educational institutions.

Political life 
Subsequently his careers in business and politics began. he joined the Awami League. After 1991, he joined the BNP. He participated in the elections of the national parliament three times. He was twice an independent member of parliament (1986 and 2001) in Sylhet-6 (Beanibazar-Golapganj) seat. He stood as an independent candidate for the seat in the 2008 election, but was defeated.

Personal life 
Syed Makbul Hossain died on 16 March 2022, at the age of 75.

See also 
 1986 Bangladeshi general election
 2001 Bangladeshi general election

References

External links 
 List of 3rd Parliament Members- Jatiya Sangsad
 List of 8th Parliament Members- Jatiya Sangsad

1946 births
2022 deaths
20th-century Bengalis
21st-century Bengalis
3rd Jatiya Sangsad members
8th Jatiya Sangsad members
People from Golapganj Upazila
Bangladeshi people of Arab descent
Bangladesh Nationalist Party politicians
People of the Bangladesh Liberation War
University of Dhaka alumni
University of Calcutta alumni